The 1976 Family Circle Cup was a women's tennis tournament played on outdoor clay courts at Amelia Island, Florida in the United States. The event was part of the 1976 WTA Tour. It was the fourth edition of the tournament and was held from March 28 through April 2, 1976. First-seeded Chris Evert won the singles title, her third consecutive title at the event, and earned $25,000 first-prize money.

Finals

Singles
 Chris Evert defeated  Kerry Reid 6–2, 6–2
 It was Evert's 6th singles title of the year and the 61st of her career.

Doubles
 Ilana Kloss /  Linky Boshoff defeated  Kathy Kuykendall /  Valerie Ziegenfuss 6–3, 6–2

References

External links
 Women's Tennis Association (WTA) tournament details

Family Circle Cup
Family Circle Cup
Charleston Open
Family Circle Cup
Family Circle Cup
Family Circle Cup